Dysoxylum gotadhora is a tree in the family Meliaceae. It is native to Bhutan, India, Laos, Nepal, Thailand, and Vietnam. The name Dysoxylum ficiforme (Wight) Gamble in India and Sri Lanka is categorized as the same plant as is D. binectariferum.

Description
The heartwood is a reddish color. The leaves are compound, imparipinnate; apex acuminate; base asymmetric-attenuate with entire margin. The flowers are white-colored and show axillary panicles inflorescence. The fruit is a four-seeded obovoid capsule and becomes red when ripened. The seeds are dark purple with white aril.

References

Other sources

gotadhora
Trees of the Indian subcontinent
Trees of Indo-China
Plants described in 1875